Dennis Morton Horne (19 October 1920 – 3 May 2015) was an English chess player. Chess Olympiad individual silver medal winner (1952).

Biography
After World War II, Dennis Morton Horne retired from the army as a captain and studied at University of Oxford, where he became seriously obsessed with chess. In the 1948 Plymouth International Chess Tournament, he won the former World chess champion Max Euwe. In 1949 he won the 2nd place in Swiss-system British Chess Championship. He was a sharp-style chess player, often using such  chess opening as King's Gambit. Dennis Morton Horne represented the English team in Chess Olympiad in 1952, where he won an individual silver medal. In 1954, he still took part in the Hastings International Chess Congress, which, although surpassing Friðrik Ólafsson, still ranks last. In later years, the less time Dennis Morton Hornespent on chess, the more he became obsessed with Contract bridge.

References

External links

Dennis Morton Horne chess games at 365chess.com

1920 births
2015 deaths
People from Surrey
English chess players
Chess Olympiad competitors